Jesse van Bezooijen  (born 28 April 1994) is a Dutch footballer who plays as a centre-back.

Club career
Van Bezooijen came through the NAC youth ranks and made his Eredivisie debut in November 2014. Not a first team regular, the defender tore his Achilles tendon in January 2016 in his first match of the 2015/16 season, which would take him out of the game for six to nine months.

References

External links
 

1994 births
Living people
Footballers from Breda
Dutch footballers
Dutch expatriate footballers
Association football central defenders
NAC Breda players
Eredivisie players
Eerste Divisie players
Dutch expatriate sportspeople in Belgium
Expatriate footballers in Belgium